Thio Su Mien (nee Huang) is a Singaporean former legal academic and lawyer. She was the dean of the National University of Singapore's Faculty of Law from 1968 to 1971.

Education and career 
Huang Su Mien was born to the Reverend Huang Yang Ying, the founding principal of the Anglican High School. She graduated from the Faculty of Law of the University of Malaya (now the National University of Singapore) in 1961, a member of the university's first batch of law graduates, and went on to teach at the faculty. In 1968, she was promoted to Vice-Dean and subsequently Dean of the faculty, making her the seventh dean of the faculty since its establishment in 1959. In 1971, she left academia to work in private practice.

In the 1980s, she became a partner at the Singaporean firm Drew and Napier. In 1998, she founded the law firm Thio Su Mien & Partners (now TSMP Law Corporation), which is now run by her son and daughter-in-law.

Political activities 

In 2009, a group of conservative Christian women from the Church of Our Savior, under the leadership of Josie Lau and Thio, took over the executive council of the group alleging AWARE, a non-governmental organization in Singapore concerned with promoting gender equality. 6 of the 11 newly elected executive committee were church members who had only joined the group 3 months prior to the election, and 80 of the 120 attendees of the meeting were similarly new members from the church. The old guard called for a no-confidence vote and the new council was voted out of office on 2 May 2009. Of the 2,175 people who voted at the meeting, 1,414 voted for the no-confidence. Deputy Prime minister Wong Kan Seng commented that "a group of conservative Christians, all attending the same church, which held strong views on homosexuality, had moved in and taken over AWARE because they disapproved of what AWARE had been doing", and called for tolerance, cautioning that religion and politics must be kept separate.

Personal life 
Thio was married to Thio Gim Hock, former chairman of OUE Limited, until his death in 2020. She has two children, Thio Li-Ann and Thio Shen Yi.

Selected publications 

 '[The Presidential Council:] Paper I' (1969) 1 Singapore Law Review 1: 2–8

References 

Singaporean lawyers
Singaporean activists
Singaporean academic administrators
National University of Singapore deans